Doris sugashimae is a species of sea slug, a dorid nudibranch, a marine gastropod mollusc in the family Dorididae.

Distribution
This species was described from Japan. It has been reported from 4 m depth at Futou beach, Tago, Futou, Dougashima, Nishiizu, Japan.

References

Dorididae
Gastropods described in 1998